The 1946–47 season was the 24th season of the Slovenian Republic League and the second as part of the country of SFR Yugoslavia.  The league champions were Enotnost.

Final table

Qualification for the Yugoslav Second League

External links
Football Association of Slovenia 

Slovenian Republic Football League seasons
Yugo
3
Football
Football